Jovano, Jovanke is a traditional folk song originating from the region of Macedonia. It is popular in and frequently performed in North Macedonia, Bulgaria, and the Macedonia region of Greece. The song has also been adapted and performed in neighboring Balkan states such as Bosnia and Herzegovina, Serbia and Croatia. It is about two young lovers separated by their disapproving parents. The song mentions the Vardar river which runs through present-day North Macedonia and present-day Greece.<ref> </ref>

Renditions
Macedonian singer and songwriter Aleksandar Sarievski performed a traditional version of the song throughout his musical career (1946–2002).
In 1967 Yugoslav beat band Zlatni Dečaci recorded a version of the song for Vladan Slijepčević's film Where to After the Rain?.
In 1967 the song was performed by Esther & Abi Ofarim for their album 2 In 3.
In 1968 Turkish singer Ajda Pekkan recorded a version of the song titled as Ne Tadı Var Bu Dünyanın with newly written lyrics in Turkish language.
In 1985 German Folkgroup Farfarello performed Jovano on their debutalbum
In 1986 Croatian and former Yugoslav hard rock band Osmi Putnik incorporated a part of the melody in their song "Jovana".
In 1986 Macedonian and former Yugoslav jazz-fusion and rock band Leb i Sol, produced an instrumental version of the song.
In 1991 Croatian singer and songwriter Branimir Štulić recorded song for his album "Sevdah za Paulu Horvat". Later, in 2012, he recorded one more version in his home-studio in Netherlands.
In 1994 Macedonian and former Yugoslav band Anastasia included a part of the melody in the score "Coming Back Home 1" for the soundtrack of Before the Rain.
In 1995 and 2006 Berlin-based world music band 17 Hippies released versions of the song on their albums Rock 'n' Roll 13 and Hippies Live in Berlin, respectively.
In 1997 and 2003, Vienna-based world music band Nim Sofyan released versions of the song.
In 1999 Romanian band Transsylvania Phoenix included a version of the song on their album Ora-Hora.
In 1999 the Czech band Gothart included a version on their album Adio querida.
In 2001 two pioneers of Celtic bouzouki, Roger Landes and Chipper Thompson, recorded an instrumental version on their album The Janissary Stomp.
In 2003 New Zealand-based world music band Many Hands released a version of this song on their album Routes.
In 2003 Polish band Kroke and the violinist Nigel Kennedy performed this song on their album East meets East.
In 2006 Macedonian singer Toše Proeski released a version of the song on his album Božilak. Proeski has frequently performed the song at live concerts.
In 2007 Bulgarian entertainer Slavi Trifonov performed the song and filmed a patriotic video to accompany it, which recreates the Bulgarian victory in the Battle of Doiran during the First World War.
In 2009  Kosovan Turk singer  and Turkish actress Şebnem Sönmez performed the song as "Yovano Yovanke". The song was also used in the  Turkish television series .
In 2009 Croatian-Istrian-based band Hot Club de Istra made a gypsy jazz arrangement of the song.
In 2009 the melody of this song was used in the sixth sequel of the TV advertising campaign Macedonia Timeless.
In 2011 Polish producer Marcin Wyrosek released a version of the song with Polish singer Kayah.
In 2011 What Cheer? Brigade, a brass band based in Providence, Rhode Island, released a version of the song on their album Classy: Live in Pawtucket.
In March 2014 the Slovenian vocal choir Perpetuum Jazzile released an a capella arrangement of the song.
In 2015 Croatian singer Nina Kraljić, who represented Croatia in the Eurovision Song Contest, performed the song live.
In 2017 the Serbian group Alice in WonderBand performed the song in arrangement for body percussion, vocals and didgeridoo on the television show Ja imam talenat!''.

References

External links

Jovano Jovanke performed by Esther & Abi Ofarim
Jovano, Jovanke performed by Toše Proeski and Bilja Krstic
Jovano Jovanke performed only by Toše Proeski
Jovano Jovanke performed by Selimova-Želčeski
Jovano Jovanke performed by 17 Hippies
Javano Jovanke performed by Nigel Kennedy
Jovano Jovanke performed by Many Hands
Jovano Jovanke performed by Ethnotrip

See also
Music of North Macedonia
Music of Bulgaria

Macedonian folk songs
Bulgarian folk songs
Year of song unknown
Songwriter unknown
Serbian folk songs
Esther & Abi Ofarim songs
Fictional Macedonian people
Fictional Bulgarian people 
Fictional Serbian people